Jaime Wyatt (born September 29, 1985) is an American country music singer, songwriter and guitarist who has released two albums and multiple singles and live recordings. She is active in the Americana and outlaw country genres, and has recorded with artists and producers including Shooter Jennings, Sam Morrow, Sam Outlaw, and more.

Wyatt grew up in Tacoma, Washington where she was raised by musician parents that exposed her to the music of Tom Petty, Bob Dylan, Hank Williams, The Pretenders, and many popular country artists of the 1990s.

At the age of 17, after moving from a rural island in Washington State to Los Angeles and securing her first record deal with Lakeshore Records, her songs were licensed for a handful of on-screen appearances and soundtracks. The song "Light Switch" was featured on the soundtrack to the motion picture Wicker Park, alongside artists including The Postal Service, Death Cab for Cutie, Stereophonics, Múm, and others.

In 2017, Wyatt debuted her first album Felony Blues with Forty Below Records. The songs address topics including her crime, addiction, depression, and recovery.

Wyatt recently relocated to Nashville, TN where she signed with New West Records. Wyatt's new album Neon Cross was released on May 29, 2020.

As of May 2020, she has released two albums as a solo artist.

References 

1985 births
Living people
American country singer-songwriters
American country guitarists
Musicians from Santa Monica, California
Musicians from Tacoma, Washington
Country musicians from California
Country musicians from Washington (state)
Singer-songwriters from California
Singer-songwriters from Washington (state)